Dodge County is the name of four counties in the United States:

 Dodge County, Georgia 
 Dodge County, Minnesota 
 Dodge County, Nebraska 
 Dodge County, Wisconsin